Windy Standard is a hill in the Carsphairn and Scaur Hills range, part of the Southern Uplands of Scotland. It lies in Dumfries and Galloway, south of the town of New Cumnock. Once a remote hill to the northeast of Cairnsmore of Carsphairn, its summit area and slopes are now home to a series of expanding large windfarm sites, the earliest of which used to be the largest windfarm in Scotland.

Subsidiary SMC Summits

References

Marilyns of Scotland
Grahams
Donald mountains
Mountains and hills of Dumfries and Galloway